The following is a list of notable events and releases that happened in Scandinavian music in 2016. (Go to last year in Scandinavian music or next year in Scandinavian music.)

Events

January
 8 – The first recording is released of Danish composer Hans Abrahamsen's Grawemeyer award-winning work, let me tell you.
 15 – Icelandic broadcaster RÚV reveals the songs competing to be Iceland's entry in the Eurovision Song Contest 2016 during the Rás 2 radio programmes Virkir morgnar and Poppland. Five of the competitors enter English versions of their songs.
 21 – The 2016 Ice Music Festival opens in Geilo, Norway (January 21–24).
 25 – The draw to determine which country will participate in which semi-final of the Eurovision Song Contest 2016 takes place in Stockholm City Hall. Sweden is pre-allocated to vote and perform in the first semi-final for scheduling reasons. 
 27 
The Léonie Sonning Music Foundation announces Leonidas Kavakos as the recipient of the Léonie Sonning Music Prize 2017.
The 2016 Bodø Jazz Open opens in Bodø, Norway (January 27–30).
 29 
The Ernst von Siemens Music Foundation announces Per Nørgård as the recipient of the 2016 Ernst von Siemens Music Prize.
The 2016 Nordlysfestivalen opens in Tromsø, Norway (January 29 – February 7).

February
 6 
Opening of the 56th Melodifestivalen in Sweden.
The first of the Uuden Musiikin Kilpailu 2016 Semi-finals takes place in Finland.
 7 
The annual Oslo Operaball takes place in Oslo, Norway.
Knut Kristiansen and Bergen Big Band hold a release concert for the album Kuria Suite at Verftet in Bergen, Norway.
 10 – The Ojai Music Festival announces the appointment of Esa-Pekka Salonen as its music director for the 2018 season.
 13 – The Dansk Melodi Grand Prix Final takes place at the Forum Horsens in Horsens, Denmark. Lighthouse X are selected to represent Denmark at the Eurovision Song Contest 2016.
 15 – It is announced that Swedish jazz saxophonist and composer Jonas Kullhammar is the recipient of the 2016 Gullinpriset (awarded in memory of the saxophonist Lars Gullin (1928–1976)).
 16 – Andreas Loven holds a release concert for the album District Six (Losen Records) at Victoria – National Jazz Scene in Oslo.
 20 – At Söngvakeppnin 2016 in Reykjavík's Laugardalshöll, Greta Salóme is selected to represent Iceland at the Eurovision Song Contest, with the song "Hear Them Calling".
 26 – A remix of Zara Larsson's hit single "Lush Life", featuring Tinie Tempah, is released, and soon becomes a top 10 hit internationally.
 27 – The Uuden Musiikin Kilpailu 2016 Final takes place in Finland.

March
 2 – By:Larm 2016 starts in Oslo (March 2–5).
 3
 Frode Alnæs holds a release concert for the album Kanestrøm (Øra Fonogram) at Victoria – National Jazz Scene in Oslo.
 The Oslo International Church Music Festival 2016 starts in Oslo (March 3–13).
 12 – The final of Sweden's Melodifestivalen takes place.
 17 – Norwegian musician John Martin is convicted of the murder of his wife Natalia Strelchenko, a Russian-born concert pianist, and is sentenced to life in prison.
 18 – The Vossajazz event opens in Voss, Norway (March 18–20).
 23 – Inferno Metal Festival 2016 starts in Oslo (March 23–26).

April
 1 – In the final of season 9 of Denmark's X Factor, the sister duo Embrace emerge winners, obtaining 60% of the public vote. 
 22 – The final of season 5 of The Voice of Finland is won by Suvi Åkerman, mentored by Tarja Turunen.
 23 – The Gamlestaden Jazzfestival opens in Göteborg, Sweden (April 23 – April 30).

May
 14 – The final of the Eurovision Song Contest 2016 takes place at the Ericsson Globe in Stockholm. Sweden, the only Scandinavian country to reach the final, finishes in 9th place. Finland, Iceland, Denmark and Norway are all eliminated in the semi-finals.
 25 – Festspillene i Bergen 2015 starts (May 25 – June 8).
 26 – Nattjazz starts in Bergen (May 26 – June 4).

June
 15 – Bergenfest 2016 with headliner Sigur Rós (June 15 – 18).
 25 – The 2016 Roskilde Festival opens with a performance by the Syrian National Orchestra for Arabic Music and Damon Albarn (June 25 – July 2).
 30 – Bråvalla Festival opens near Norrköping, Sweden.

July
 3 – The Copenhagen Jazz Festival 2016 opens (July 3–12).
 6 – The 17th Folk music festival of Siglufjordur opens in Siglufjordur, Iceland (July 6 – 10).
 14 – G! Festival opens in Göta, with a line-up including Songhoy Blues, Lucy Rose, Federspiel and the Hot 8 Brass Band.
 18 – Moldejazz 2016 starts with Ola Kvernberg as artist in residence (August 18 – 23).
 date unknown – Magnus Söderman (guitars) and Lawrence Dinamarca (drums) join Nightrage.

August
 14 – Oslo Jazzfestival 2016 opens with a concert by the Jan Garbarek Group, featuring Trilok Gurtu (August 14 – 20).

September
 4 – The 11th Punktfestivalen opens in Kristiansand, Norway (September 4–6).

October
 7 – The 33rd Stockholm Jazz Festival opens in Stockholm, Sweden (October 7–16).
 13 – The 33rd DølaJazz opens in Lillehammer, Norway (October 13–16).

November
 1 – Hans Abrahamsen wins the Nordic Council Music Prize for his work Let Me Tell You.
 3 – Tampere Jazz Happening opens in Tampere, Finland (November 3–6).
 6 – The Kongsberg Jazzfestival 2016 opens with Pat Metheny concert (August 6 – 9).

December
 6 – Danish band Lukas Graham are nominated for three Grammy Awards, including Record of the Year and Song of the Year for their single "7 Years".

Albums released

January
 8 – Anders Hillborg – Sirens, Cold Heat;, Beast Sampler
 22 – Abbath's debut album Abbath 
 29
 What Was Said by Tord Gustavsen and his trio, featuring drummer Jarle Vespestad and German-Afghan vocalist Simin Tander (ECM Records
 Momento by pianist Ayumi Tanaka Trio (AMP) including with Christian Meaas Svendsen (bass) and Per Oddvar Johansen (drums).
 Ghostlights by Finnish music project Avantasia
 High Noon by Finnish guitarist Kalle Kalima (ACT Music).
 Some Other Time – A Tribute To Leonard Bernstein by Nils Landgren (ACT Music).

February
 1 – Songbook by Lars Danielsson (ACT Music).
 3 – Kanestrøm by Norwegian guitarist Frode Alnæs (Øra Fonogram).
 9 – The Colorist & Emiliana Torrini by The Colorist & Emiliana Torrini
 11 – 2016: District Six by the pianist Andreas Loven (Losen Records)
 12 – Olavi by Olavi Uusivirta
 14 – Story Of I by Myrna (Tomtom & Braza).
 17 – Picture You by The Amazing, including guitarist Reine Fiske (Partisan Records).
 19 – Grasque by Choir of Young Believers
 26 – We Survive by Medina

March
 3 – Kanestrøm by Norwegian guitarist Frode Alnæs (Øra Fonogram).
 6 – Trees Of Light by Anders Jormin / Lena Willemark / Karin Nakagawa (ECM Records).
 11 – Culturen by Skadedyr (Hubro Records).
 18 – Reckless Twin by Mads Langer
 25 – Let’s Dance by Per Oddvar Johansen (Edition Records).
 26 – We Survive by Medina

April
 8 – Arktis by Ihsahn (Candlelight Records)
 15 – Closer by Christopher (EMI)
 22 – Jag sjunger ljuset by Eva Dahlgren

May
 20 – Då som nu för alltid by Kent (RCA Records)

June
 1 – World On Fire by Yngwie Malmsteen
 3 
 The Brightest Void by Tarja Turunen
 Good Karma by Roxette
 Seal the Deal & Let's Boogie by Volbeat 
 10 – Wolf Valley by | Eyolf Dale
 28 – Now Is The Time by Spirit In The Dark (Audun Erlien, Anders Engen, David Wallumrød)

July
9 – Sounds Of 3 by Per Mathisen Trio (including Frode Alnæs and Gergő Borlai)
15 – Vulnicura Live by Björk
29 – Rubicon by Mats Eilertsen

August
5 – Apokaluptein by Live Maria Roggen
19
Femte by Isglem
Norwegian Caravan by Come Shine – Kringkastingsorkesteret
26
Air by Frode Haltli with the Trondheim Soloists and Arditti Quartet
Rumi Songs by Trygve Seim
Snowmelt by Marius Neset
Du Gamla Du Fria by Håkan Hellström
The Map of Your Life by Simon Lynge

September
2 
Buoyancy by Nils Petter Molvær
Bushman's Fire by Bushman's Revenge
Jazz, Fritt Etter Hukommelsen by Bushman's Revenge
Salmeklang by Gjermund Larsen Trio
9
Atmosphères by Tigran Hamasyan, Arve Henriksen, Eivind Aarset, and Jan Bang
Changing Tides by Lukas Zabulionis
Grand White Silk by Torun Eriksen
Joni Was Right I & II by Marit Larsen
16
Dödliga Klassiker by Bob Hund (Woah Dad!).
Orphée by Jóhann Jóhannsson
Sunrain by Haakon Graf Trio, including Erik Smith and Per Mathisen
23
Lampophrenia by Sonja Vectomov (Uneventful Records).
30
Blood Bitch by Jenny Hval
It’s Another Wor d by Sigrun Tara Øverland
Somewhere In Between by Bugge Wesseltoft

October
7
Gode Liv by Stein Torleif Bjella
Kurzsam and Fulger by Christian Wallumrød Ensemble
14 – Rainbow Session by Harald Lassen
21
Citizen of Glass by Agnes Obel
Her Bor by Frida Ånnevik
Pyhät Tekstit by Vesa-Matti Loiri
 28 
Homeward Bound by Sabina Ddumba (Warner Music Sweden).
Drömmen om julen by Carola Häggkvist
Lady Wood by Tove Lo (Island Records)
31 – No Right No Left by Andreas Wildhagen

November
4 – Atoma by Dark Tranquillity
11
December Songs by Olga Konkova and Jens Thoresen
StaiStua by Ulvo / Hole / Haltli
The Mechanical Fair by Ola Kvernberg
The Sleeping Gods/Thorn by Enslaved
12 – Stories by Jan Gunnar Hoff
14 – Portrait With Hidden Face by Bjørn Kruse
17 – My Head Is Listening by Motif
19 – 3 Pianos by Tanaka/Lindvall/Wallumrød
25
Fantômas by Amiina
Häxan by Dungen (Mexican Summer).
Vannmann 86 by Hjerteslag

December
2 – Puzzler by Hilma Nikolaisen
11 – Minnismerki by Bubbi Morthens and Dimma
16 
Dråber af Tid by Helene Blum
Into the Night World by Machinae Supremacy
New York City Magic by Per Mathisen, Utsi Zimring, and David Kikoski

date unknown
Efter Regnet by Freddie Wadling
Mitt hjärta klappar för dig by Benny Anderssons orkester
Timo sjunger Ted by Timo Räisänen
Ventre by In Slaughter Natives

New classical works
 Hans Abrahamsen – Left, alone for piano left hand and orchestra
 Olli Kortekangas – Migrations
 Christian Lindberg
 Robot Gardens
 Liverpool Lullabies
 Magnus Lindberg – Two Episodes
 Kaija Saariaho – Sense
 Rolf Wallin – Swans Kissing (string quartet)

Eurovision Song Contest
 Denmark in the Eurovision Song Contest 2016
 Finland in the Eurovision Song Contest 2016
 Iceland in the Eurovision Song Contest 2016
 Norway in the Eurovision Song Contest 2016
 Sweden in the Eurovision Song Contest 2016

Deaths
 17 January – Carina Jaarnek, Swedish singer and Dansband artist, 53 (cerebral haemorrhage) 
 18 January – Else Marie Pade, Danish composer, 91 
 25 January – Leif Solberg, Norwegian composer and organist, 101
 4 February – Ulf Söderblom, Finnish conductor, 85
 19 February – Harald Devold, Norwegian jazz musician, 51 (cancer)
 20 February 
, Danish musician, 77
Ove Verner Hansen, Danish actor and opera singer, 85
 29 February – Josefin Nilsson, Swedish singer, 46
 24 April – Jan Henrik Kayser, Norwegian pianist, 81
 1 May – Sydney Onayemi, Nigerian-born Swedish DJ, 78
 4 May – Olle Ljungström, Swedish singer and guitarist, 54
 9 May – Riki Sorsa, Finnish singer ("Reggae OK"), 63 (cancer)
 14 May – Lasse Mårtenson, Finnish singer ("Laiskotellen"), 81
 16 May – Fredrik Norén, Swedish jazz drummer, 75 (death announced on this date)
 2 June – Freddie Wadling, Swedish singer and songwriter, 64
 8 June – Terje Fjærn, 73, Norwegian orchestra conductor ("La det swinge").
 18 June – Sverre Kjelsberg, 69, Norwegian singer, guitarist, bassist, composer, and lyricist
 27 June – Pelle Gudmundsen-Holmgreen, Danish composer, 83
 18 July – Karina Jensen, Danish singer (Cartoons), cancer. (death announced on this date)
 27 July – Einojuhani Rautavaara, Finnish composer, 87
 27 September – , Swedish singer, 80
 30 September – Lilleba Lund Kvandal, Norwegian opera singer, 76
 12 November – Jacques Werup, Swedish musician and writer, 71
 14 December
, Norwegian singer and entertainer, 91
Päivi Paunu, Finnish singer, 70 (cancer)

References

Norwegian music
Norwegian
Scandinavian culture